Evergreen Korea Party (늘푸른한국당) was a liberal conservative political party in South Korea, founded on January 11, 2017. Lee Jae-oh and Choi Byung-kuk were co-chairpersons of the party.

The party officially dissolved on February 9, 2018, with most members rejoining the Liberty Korea Party.

References

2017 establishments in South Korea
2018 disestablishments in South Korea
Centrist parties in Asia
Conservative parties in South Korea
Defunct political parties in South Korea
Political parties disestablished in 2018
Political parties established in 2017
Liberty Korea Party